Events in the year 2004 in Ukraine.

Incumbents 

 President: Leonid Kuchma
 Prime Minister: Viktor Yanukovych

Events 

 27 – 28 October – The 60th Anniversary of the Liberation of Ukraine was held in Kyiv, Ukraine on the occasion of the 60th anniversary of the liberation of Ukraine from Nazi Invaders.

Deaths

References 

 
Ukraine
Ukraine
2000s in Ukraine
Years of the 21st century in Ukraine